Trigonopeltastes is a genus of fruit and flower chafers in the beetle family Scarabaeidae, found in North and Central America. There are more than 20 described species in Trigonopeltastes.

Species
These 27 species belong to the genus Trigonopeltastes:

 Trigonopeltastes arborfloricola Smith, 2016
 Trigonopeltastes archimedes Schaum, 1841
 Trigonopeltastes aurovelutinus Curoe, 2011
 Trigonopeltastes barbatus Howden & Joly, 1998
 Trigonopeltastes delta (Forster, 1771) (delta flower scarab)
 Trigonopeltastes deltoides (Newmann, 1838)
 Trigonopeltastes discrepans Howden, 1968
 Trigonopeltastes femoratus Howden, 1968
 Trigonopeltastes floridana (Casey, 1909) (scrub palmetto scarab)
 Trigonopeltastes floridanus
 Trigonopeltastes formidulosus Smith, 2016
 Trigonopeltastes frontalis Bates, 1889
 Trigonopeltastes geometricus Schaum, 1841
 Trigonopeltastes glabellus Howden, 1988
 Trigonopeltastes henryi Smith, 2016
 Trigonopeltastes intermedius Bates, 1889
 Trigonopeltastes kerleyi Ricchiardi, 2003
 Trigonopeltastes mombachoensis Smith, 2016
 Trigonopeltastes pontilis Howden, 1988
 Trigonopeltastes sallaei Bates, 1889
 Trigonopeltastes simplex Bates, 1889
 Trigonopeltastes thomasi Howden & Ratcliffe, 1990
 Trigonopeltastes triangulus (Kirby, 1818)
 Trigonopeltastes truncatus Howden, 1968
 Trigonopeltastes variabilis Howden, 1968
 Trigonopeltastes wappesi Howden, 1988
 Trigonopeltastes warneri Smith, 2016

References

Further reading

 
 

Cetoniinae